Bangalore Management Academy, a private management institution, was founded in 2005 in  Bangalore, India.

Administration 

The institute is governed by a board composed of Dr. N. Jayasankaran, Honorary Dean and Advisor, Former Vice Chancellor of SCSVMV, Robert Donison, Managing Director, BMA Founder Director, LSC Group of Colleges, London, U.K and Ajith Thacholi, Executive Director.

Courses offered

Postgraduate programme

Courses offered under Master's programs are in Finance, Human Resource Management, International
Business, Information Systems, Marketing Management, Hospitality and Tourism Management, Post
Graduate Program in Retail Management (PGPRM)-rai, Professional Finance and Banking & LLM in
International Business Law.
international

Undergraduate programme 

Courses offered under Bachelor's programs are in Software Engineering, IT-Information Technology,
International Business Management, Business Management, Accounting & Finance, Computer Games Development, Information Technology Network Computing, Web Media Technology, Marketing Management & Human Resource Management.

References 
BIM's programme in Bangalore 
Business School to deliver MBA in India
competition-success review

External links 
 College Website
 BMA Alumni

Business schools in Bangalore